Rodrigo Antonio Neri González (born May 12, 2005) is an American professional soccer player currently playing as a forward for Atlético Madrid.

Club career
Born in Miami, Florida, United States, Neri joined the academy of Atlético Madrid from Alcorcón in 2021.

International career
Neri has represented the United States at youth international level. He is also eligible to represent Venezuela.

References

2005 births
Living people
American people of Venezuelan descent
Soccer players from Miami
Soccer players from Florida
American soccer players
United States men's youth international soccer players
Association football forwards
AD Alcorcón footballers
Atlético Madrid footballers
American expatriate soccer players
American expatriate sportspeople in Spain
Expatriate footballers in Spain